Issifu Seidu (born 24 July 1969) is a Ghanaian politician and member of parliament for the Nalerigu constituency in the North East Region of Ghana.

References 

1969 births
Living people